Mangifera odorata (commonly known as kwini, kweni, kuweni, kuwini, kuini, or Saipan mango) is a species of plant in the family Anacardiaceae. It is commonly found along coastal towns or travel routes in Southeast Asia. "Also found in Peninsular Thailand, South Sulawesi and in Philippines on South coast of Mindanao, in Sulu Archipelago and neighboring islands". "It is a well known fruit tree commonly cultivated in villages throughout Southeast Asia".

M. odorata has a skin that is yellow to green in colour. The flesh of the fruit has an orange to yellow colour and is sour or sweet when eaten. The fruits are round in shape and have a smooth skin that range from yellow-green. The tree flowers have a pleasant fragrance. The fruits are round or oblong in shape and have a skin that ranges from yellow-green.

Description

Morphology 
Mangifera odorata is a fruit plant that grows approximately 10–15 m in height, hardly ever growing past 20 m. The crown has a wide round shape. The trunk stands in an upright straight position that appears to have a grayish colour "containing an irritant sap". Leaf morphology is "oblong-lance shaped" that has a "non-wavy edge". Veins are also noticeable on the leaf.

The plant has flowers are approximately 6 mm wide, emit a pleasant scent as well as appear to be yellowish-green in colour. The rachis has a reddish-brown colour. Petals are lance-shaped and at the base have a yellowish colour but turn dark red later on. The apex or tip of the petal is pale pink in colour. The sepals which appear to be brown-red or partly green in colour look oval shaped and are roughly 3–4 mm long. Within the flower, there is 1 fertile stamen that serve in reproduction and is about 5 mm in length. The staminodes which are approximately 1.5–2 mm long. Another reproductive organ called the ovary is round in shape, yellowish to dark red and about 3–5 mm in length. The pollen is "elliptic and tapering towards poles"

The fruit has a yellow to green skin colour. When it is ripe the skin turns green. The flesh is orange to yellow and can taste sweet or source when consumed. The seed inside is both flat in shape with a hairy/fibrous surface.

Origin and Distribution 
Mangifera odorata exact origins are unknown. However, the species represents a hybrid between Mangifera indica known as the Indian mango and Mangifera foetida which is known as the horse mango. M.odorata is native to tropical Asia and can be found in areas such as Philippines, Peninsular Thailand, South Sulawesi, Sulu Archipelago and other close islands". "In Southeast Asia it is an introduced species".

Habitat 
Mangifera odorata thrive in tropical wet climates which have both heavy and moderate rainfall. However, they are unable to survive and grow in places that have continuous dry climates. M. odorata is common in cultivation but does not normally grow in the wild.

Pests 
Mangifera odorata is known to be a major host of Bactrocera dorsalis, Ciripestis eutraphera, Coptotermes, Coptotermes cuvignathus, Cryptorhynchus frigidus, Deanolis albizonalis, Marasmiellus scandens and Marasmius crinis-equi.

Food/Nutrition 
M.odorata is a fruit which can be consumed. While it can be consumed in its raw form, the fruit is usually made or incorporated into something else such as chutneys. M. odorata fruit pulp is also a good source of nutrition. When M.odorata has not reached maturity, its pulp is a good source for "dietary fibre, vitamin C, vitamin E". The mature pulp is good to eat because of "protein, ash, fat, soluble carbohydrate and B vitamin". The fruit's seed kernel is "rich in fat, protein, carbohydrate, and ash". The peel or skin is a great source of "fibre, minerals, β-Carotene and ascorbic acid".

Conservation Status 
They are considered to be data deficient and are not label as endangered, threatened, or extinct. Their genetic material is stored in germplasm repositories where it may be used for future cultivar and research uses.

References 

odorata
Flora of Guam
Trees of the Philippines
Trees of Thailand
Trees of Vietnam
Taxonomy articles created by Polbot